As a geographical entity distinct from the mainland, the Isle of Wight has always fought to have this identity recognised. The Isle of Wight is currently a ceremonial and Non-metropolitan county and local government is by unitary authority. The island is also the highest populated Westminster constituency in the country.

Political history
Historically, the island was part of the historic county of Hampshire, previously called Southamptonshire.

Historic boroughs of the Island
The island's most ancient borough was Newtown on the large natural harbour on the island's north-western coast. A French raid in 1377, that destroyed much of the town as well as other Island settlements, sealed its permanent decline. By the middle of the sixteenth century, it was a small settlement long eclipsed by the more easily defended town of Newport. Elizabeth I breathed some life into the town by awarding two parliamentary seats but this ultimately made it one of the most notorious of the Rotten Boroughs. By the time of the Great Reform Act that abolished the seats, it had just fourteen houses and twenty-three voters. The Act also disenfranchised the borough of Yarmouth and replaced the four lost seats with the first MP for the whole Isle of Wight. Newport retained its two seats until the Second Reform Act 1867 which reduced its representation to one MP. Newport lost its separate representation entirely as a result of the Redistribution of Seats Act 1885.

Local governance
Often thought of as part of Hampshire, the Isle of Wight was briefly included in that county when the first county councils were created in 1888. However, a "Home Rule" campaign led to a separate Isle of Wight County Council being established in 1890, and the island has remained independent of mainland local government ever since. The island was, however, part of the "Assize county" of Hampshire. Like inhabitants of many islands, Islanders are fiercely jealous of their real (or perceived) independence, and confusion over the Island's separate status is a perennial source of friction.

It was planned to merge the county back into Hampshire as a district in the 1974 local government reform, but a last minute change led to it retaining its county council. However, since there was no provision made in the Local Government Act 1972 for unitary authorities, the Island had to retain a two-tier structure, with a county council and two boroughs, Medina and South Wight.

The borough councils were merged with the county council on 1 April 1995 to form a single unitary authority, the Isle of Wight Council, as recommended by the Local Government Commission for England. The only significant present-day administrative link with Hampshire is the police service, which is joint between Hampshire and the Isle of Wight.

House of Commons representation

The Isle of Wight forms a single constituency of the House of Commons, with an electorate of 113,021 (as of 2019). This is by far the largest electorate in the country. The 2018 proposals from the Boundary Commission for England will split the constituency into two.

The constituency was traditionally a battleground between the Conservatives and the Liberal Democrats. Between 1974 and 1987, the seat was a Liberal seat, then becoming Conservative until 1997 when the Liberal Democrats won on a reduced Conservative vote. The seat reverted to the Conservatives in 2001, and has remained Conservative since, with the Liberal Democrats falling to fifth place in 2015, when UKIP came second. The Labour Party came second in 2017, with the Liberal Democrats and UKIP both losing their deposits.

2019 general election

The Isle of Wight reelected Conservative incumbent Bob Seely as MP in the 2019 General Election.

2017 general election
The sitting MP Andrew Turner stepped down at the 2017 United Kingdom general election held on 8 June after a controversy regarding remarks he made about homosexuality. He was replaced as the Conservative candidate by Bob Seely, an Isle of Wight councillor and former soldier who went on to be elected as the MP.

2015 general election
Six candidates stood for the Isle of Wight constituency in the 2015 United Kingdom general election which was held on 7 May 2015.

2010 general election
Eleven candidates stood for the Isle of Wight constituency in the 2010 United Kingdom general election which was held on 6 May 2010.

2005 general election
Five candidates contested the Isle of Wight constituency in the 2005 United Kingdom general election held on 5 May 2005.

The election was expected to be a close race between the Liberal Democrats and Conservatives, but the high Conservative vote even surprised the successful candidate. The simultaneous local elections resulted in a Conservative landslide, and the high turnout and popular Conservative vote in the parliamentary election was likely to be a local sign of dissatisfaction with the incumbent, largely Liberal Democrat Council, as well as reflecting on the national issues. The Labour Party continued to buck the national trend and increased the Labour vote to the highest for over 30 years, whilst the UKIP, did not manage to make the breakthrough expected by some, and only slightly increased their vote share.

Local government

After the 2017 local council elections, the Conservatives gained a majority of seats on the Isle of Wight Council. The Island Independents were the ruling group on the council between 2013 and January 2017, when the resignation of the council leader Jonathan Bacon led to a Conservative minority administration led by Dave Stewart. The council had previously been Conservative controlled between 2005 and 2013.

2017 local council elections

The local council elections were held on 4 May 2017.

2013 local council elections

The local council elections were held on 2 May 2013.

2009 local council elections

The local council elections were held on 4 June 2009, the same date as the European Parliament elections. Following a review by the Boundary Commission for England the number of councillors was reduced from 48 to 40, consisting of 38 single member constituencies and 1 double member constituency.

2005 local council elections

The local council elections were held on 5 May 2005, the same date as the general election of that year.

A local referendum on the issue of a directly elected mayor of the Isle of Wight was held at the same time as the local elections - this failed to pass, with 37,097 against to 28,786 for.

Historical results
Prior to 1995, these results are for Isle of Wight County Council.

EU referendum
The Isle of Wight voted 62% to leave the European Union in the 2016 EU referendum, compared with 52% nationally.

European parliamentary representation
The Isle of Wight was a part of the South East England region for the purposes of European Parliamentary elections.

2019 European parliamentary elections 
The following results are exclusively for the Isle of Wight; results are collated regionally prior to MEPs being assigned under the closed list proportional representation system.

2014 European parliamentary elections
The results of the 2014 European Parliament election on the Isle of Wight were as follows.

Turnout on the Isle of Wight was 35,600 out of an electorate of 111,879 (31.82%)

2009 European parliamentary elections
The results of the 2009 European election on the Isle of Wight were as follows.

The following results are exclusively for the Isle of Wight; results are collated regionally prior to MEPs being assigned under the closed list proportional representation system.

Turnout on the Isle of Wight was 43,709 on an electorate of 109,796 (39.81%)

2004 European parliamentary elections
The results of the 2004 European election on the Isle of Wight were as follows.

The following results are exclusively for the Isle of Wight; results are collated regionally prior to MEPs being assigned under the closed list proportional representation system.

Regionally, turnout was 36.5% on an electorate of 6,087,103.

Local political issues

Fixed link
For many years, there has been debate over whether or not a bridge or tunnel should connect the island with mainland Britain. This became more of an issue towards the end of the twentieth century, when it became more economically and technically feasible to build such a link, with the bridge to the Isle of Skye as a model. Continuing debate centres on whether a fixed link is desirable.

Around the start of the 21st century, the Isle of Wight Party campaigned from a positive position, although extensive public debate on the subject revealed a strong body of opinion against such a proposal. In 2002, the Isle of Wight Council debated the issue and made a policy statement against the proposal, whilst MP Andrew Turner remains opposed to the construction of a link.

Arguments in favour of a fixed link tend to concentrate upon the increased ease of access to and from the Island and a possible economic benefit from improved communications with the mainland.  People of all ages often express dissatisfaction with the cost of cross-Solent travel, and although this is not quite the same issue as the link debate, the two are often combined by the assumption that a fixed link would be cheaper.

Arguments against a fixed link include the inevitable rise in property prices stemming from making it easier to commute to cities like London (thus increasing strain on lower wage families); the risk of losing local services and facilities to the much larger and economically more active south Hampshire conurbation; the expected rise in rural crime (which increased sharply in Hampshire in 2014); and a risk to the unique island culture and environment.  An expected increase in street crime is also an issue. Overall crime rates on the island are however already at levels comparable to similar areas on the mainland and in many cases higher than other nearby areas in south Hampshire

Although those in favour of a fixed link tend to envisage a tolled road link in the same vein as the bridge to Skye, plans have also been proposed for passenger-only rail and tram links under the Solent, linking Ryde with Portsmouth and Gosport. These kind of plans have tended to win more support with island residents in the past. However public opinion has begun to change on the island in favour of a road link.

Autonomy and political recognition 
A number of discussions about the status of the island have taken place over many years, with standpoints from the extreme of wanting full sovereignty for the Isle of Wight, to what could be described as the opposite extreme of merging the county back into Hampshire. The pro-independence lobby had a formal voice in the early 1970s with the Vectis National Party. Their main claim was that the sale of the island to the crown in 1293 was unconstitutional (see History of the Isle of Wight). However, this movement now has little serious support.

Since the 1990s the debate has largely taken the form of a campaign to have the Isle of Wight recognized as a distinct region by organizations such as the EU, due to its relative poverty within southern England. One argument in favour of special treatment is that this poverty is not acknowledged by such organizations as it is distorted statistically by retired and wealthy (but less economically active) immigrants from the mainland.

In 2022, as part of the Levelling Up White Paper, an "Island Forum" was proposed, which would allow local policymakers and residents on the Isle of Wight to work alongside their counterparts in Orkney, Shetland, the Western Isles and Anglesey on common issues, such as broadband connectivity, and provide a platform for them to communicate directly with the government on the challenges island communities face in terms of levelling up.

Wind turbines
Wind turbines has been an issue the island has remained divided over since proposals were first put forward, with many residents in the West Wight, where they are likely to be built claiming they would be unsightly and create a lot of noise. In protest against wind turbines the pressure group ThWART was formed (The Wight Against Rural Turbines) with the aim of working with the council to adopt a realistic renewable energy policy with solutions other than wind turbines, claiming that any on the island would be inappropriately sited.

Initially plans were put forward for seven turbines to be built on land close to Wellow with many people around the area criticising the plan with the view that better alternatives could be found. Petitions were set up by local residents before the planning application was put forward to the council, and the plans were later rejected. Following this several other applications have been submitted to the council for turbines at various locations including small wind turbines at Ventnor Golf Club. Plans for small turbines at Cheverton Down have already been given the go ahead but plans for larger ones at 125 metres tall were rejected by Isle of Wight Council planners on 3 December 2009. It is still unclear whether developers will appeal against this decision.

General views from residents on the island have been mixed to proposals, and it is therefore unclear when and where wind turbines will eventually be constructed. The Isle of Wight Council stated that in a survey carried out at the beginning of 2009 on local residents attitudes towards wind turbines were two to one against, with 612 in favour and 1,328 against Cheverton Down proposals.

See also
Isle of Wight Council
Isle of Wight
History of the Isle of Wight
Politics of the United Kingdom

References

Local Election Results From BBC.co.uk